Daniele C. Struppa is an Italian mathematician, academic, and the 13th President of Chapman University in Orange County, California. Prior to assuming the Office of the President, Struppa was Chancellor at Chapman University for nine years and had also served as provost.

Education and career 
Struppa earned a degree in mathematics from the University of Milano, Italy, in 1977. He then moved to the United States in 1978 to pursue his Ph.D at the  University of Maryland, College Park, earning his doctorate degree in mathematics in 1981.

Struppa began his academic career in Italy where he held positions at the University of Milano, at the Scuola Normale Superiore in Pisa and at the University of Calabria. At the latter, Struppa also served as Chairman of the Department of Mathematics for two years.  

Having returned to America, Struppa accepted a professorship at George Mason University, where he founded a research center for the application of mathematics and served as director of it. In addition to serving as chairman of the Department of Mathematical Sciences at George Mason University, he was also appointed as associate dean for Graduate Programs and as Dean of the College of Arts and Sciences, a position he held for nine years.

In 2006, Struppa joined Chapman University as provost and chief academic officer. He remained in those positions until July 2007 when he was appointed chancellor.

On September 28, 2015, Struppa was elected 13th president of Chapman University and was inaugurated on September 1, 2016. He assumed office on September 1, 2016, succeeding Jim Doti, who served as president for 25 years. 

Throughout his long standing career, Struppa has authored more than 200 refereed publications and has edited several volumes. He is also the co-author of more than ten books, including The Mathematics of Superoscillations, with Chapman physicists Yakir Aharonov and Jeff Tollaksen.

Honors and awards 
In 1981, Struppa received the Bartolozzi Prize from the Italian Mathematical Union, and in 1987 the Matsumae Medal from the Matsumae International Foundation of Tokyo. In 2007, Struppa was also awarded the Cozzarelli Prize from the National Academy of Sciences for a paper he co-authored.

In 2006, the BIO-IT Coalition, a non-profit organization dedicated to the support of bioinformatics, established the Professor Daniele Struppa Award in Struppa’s honor.

Struppa was granted the Donald Bren Presidential Chair in Mathematics in 2019.

Personal life 
Struppa is married to Lisa Sparks, who is the founding Dean of the School of Communication and the Foster and Mary McGaw Endowed Professor at Chapman University. They have four children.

References 

Year of birth missing (living people)
Living people
20th-century Italian mathematicians
21st-century Italian mathematicians
Italian emigrants to the United States
University of Milan alumni
George Mason University faculty
Chapman University faculty
Heads of universities and colleges in the United States